In Roman mythology, Hersilia was a figure in the foundation myth of Rome.  She is credited with ending the war between Rome and the Sabines.

Battle of the Lacus Curtius
In some accounts she is the wife of Romulus, the founder and first King of Rome in Rome's founding myths.  She is described as such in both Livy and Plutarch; but in Dionysius, Macrobius, and another tradition recorded by Plutarch, she was instead the wife of Hostus Hostilius, a Roman champion at the time of Romulus. This would make her the grandmother of Tullus Hostilius, the third king of Rome.

Livy tells this tale in his work Ab urbe condita:

Just like her husband (who became the god Quirinus), she was deified after her death as Hora Quirini, as recounted in Ovid's Metamorphoses:

Very little concrete information is known about the deity Hora Quirini. According to Georg Wissowa, Ovid created the story of Hersilia's apotheosis into Hora Quirini. On the other hand, T.P. Wiseman argues that the story comes from an earlier Greek source.

See also

The rape of the Sabine women
Quirinus

References

External links

Roman Myth Index 
Bryn Mawr
T. P. Wiseman: The Wife and Children of Romulus (The Classical Quarterly, Vol. 33, No. 2, pp 445-452, 1983)

Characters in Roman mythology
Roman goddesses
Queens of Rome
8th-century BC Roman women